Modiga agenter is the second studio album by the Swedish pop band Freestyle. It was released in 1982 and was also recorded in English, titled Mission Impossible.

Track listing

Charts

References

External links 

 

1982 albums
Freestyle (Swedish band) albums